The Tabletop of Asymus Stedelin or Tabletop of Martin Schaffner is a 1533 painting on a tabletop, produced by the Ulm-based painter Martin Schaffner for Asymus Stedelin, a Strasbourg-based goldsmith. It is now in the Gemäldegalerie Alter Meister (Kassel).

Sources

1533 paintings
German paintings
Paintings in the collection of the Gemäldegalerie Alte Meister (Kassel)